Muhammad Hanif Abbasi (born 4 January 1966) is a Pakistani businessman and politician of Pakistan Muslim League (N). He had been a member of the National Assembly of Pakistan twice from 2002 to 2008 and again from 2008 to 2013.

Early life and education 
He was born on 4 January 1966 in Rawalpindi. He graduated from the Forman Christian College and University of the Punjab.

Political career
Abbasi started his political career as a member of Jamaat-e-Islami but later joined Pakistan Muslim League (N) (PML-N) in 2008.

He was first elected as a member of the National Assembly of Pakistan from  NA-56 (Rawalpindi VII) as a candidate of Muttahida Majlis-e-Amal (MMA) and defeated Sheikh Rashid Ahmad nephew, Sheikh Rashid Shafiq in the 2002 by-elections.

In 2008 Pakistani general election, Abbasi joined the Pakistan Muslim League (N) (PML-N) and was again elected as a member of the National Assembly of Pakistan from  NA-56 (Rawalpindi VII) on the ticket of Pakistan Muslim League (N) (PML-N) and defeated former Minister Sheikh Rashid Ahmad by bagging 73,433 votes.

In 2013 Pakistani general election, he again contested election from  NA-56 (Rawalpindi VII) as a candidate of Pakistan Muslim League (N) (PML-N) and was defeated after taking 67,169 votes against Imran Khan who obtained 80,425 votes.

In 2018 Pakistani general election, he was the nominated candidate from NA-60 (Rawalpindi-IV) on the ticket of Pakistan Muslim League (N) (PML-N), however, he was disqualified and sentenced for a lifetime in the narcotics case.

In April 2018, he was arrested in ephedrine quota case by anti-narcotics force and sentenced to prison for life by the court. However, on April 11, 2019, a bench comprising Justice Aalia Neelum of the Lahore High Court suspended the sentence, the court maintained that all other accused in the case were acquitted and all legal points were not considered during the case.

Disqualification
An F.I.R. was registered against Abbasi in June 2012 for misuse of 500 k.g. of the controlled drug ephedrine obtained for his pharmaceutical company, Gray Pharmaceutical, in 2010. In November 2012, Abbasi was granted bail from the Lahore High Court (LHC) Rawalpindi bench, however, just before election 2013, antinarcotic force submitted a challan to relook into the case before Abbasi can contest elections. However, Abbasi was allowed to contest election 2013, since his case was pending in the court.  On July, 2018, Justice Sardar Muhammad Akram, announced the judgment, in which he was found guilty in narcotics, imposing Rs. 1 million and lifetime imprisonment. He was arrested from the courts room and was shifted to Central Jail Rawalpindi. On September 22, 2018, a scandal surfaced when Abbasi's picture was released from jail in a casual dress instead of Jail's apparel with his party leadership in Central Jail Adiala superintendent, after which he was shifted to Attock Jail from Central Jail Rawalpindi. Abbasi experienced bad health during his imprisonment, reportedly he had kidney problems  He was shifted to Punjab Institute of Cardiology in January 2019 for cardiac procedures  and in March, 2019 to Shaikh Zayed Hospital for his kidney and cardiac problems.

On April 11, 2019, a bench comprising Justice Aalia Neelum of the Lahore High Court suspended the sentence, the court maintained that all other accused in the case were acquitted and all legal points were not considered during the case.

References

External links
Muhammad Hanif Abbasi – Profile at National Assembly of Pakistan

1966 births
Living people
Pakistani businesspeople
Pakistani MNAs 2002–2007
Pakistani MNAs 2008–2013
Pakistani prisoners and detainees
Jamaat-e-Islami Pakistan politicians
Pakistan Muslim League (N) MNAs
Punjabi people
Forman Christian College alumni
Politicians from Rawalpindi
Pakistani politicians convicted of crimes
Drug dealers
University of the Punjab alumni